The 1996 German Figure Skating Championships took place on January 5–7, 1996 in Berlin. Skaters competed in the disciplines of men's singles, ladies' singles, pair skating, and ice dancing.

Results

Men

Ladies

Pairs

Ice dancing

External links
 1996 German Championships results

German Figure Skating Championships, 1996
German Figure Skating Championships